In contract law, a non-compete clause (often NCC), restrictive covenant, or covenant not to compete (CNC), is a clause under which one party (usually an employee) agrees not to enter into or start a similar profession or trade in competition against another party (usually the employer). Some courts refer to these as "restrictive covenants". As a contract provision, a CNC is bound by traditional contract requirements including the consideration doctrine.

The use of such clauses is premised on the possibility that upon their termination or resignation, an employee might begin working for a competitor or start a business, and gain competitive advantage by exploiting confidential information about their former employer's operations or trade secrets, or sensitive information such as customer/client lists, business practices, upcoming products, and marketing plans.

However, an over-broad CNC may prevent an employee from working elsewhere at all. English common law originally held any such constraint to be unenforceable under the public policy doctrine. Contemporary case law permits exceptions, but generally will only enforce CNCs to the extent necessary to protect the employer. Most jurisdictions in which such contracts have been examined by the courts have deemed CNCs to be legally binding so long as the clause contains reasonable limitations as to the geographical area and time period in which an employee of a company may not compete.

The extent to which non-compete clauses are legally allowed varies per jurisdiction. For example, the state of California in the United States invalidates non-compete-clauses for all but equity stakeholders in the sale of business interests.

History
As far back as Dyer's Case in 1414, English common law chose not to enforce non-compete agreements because of their nature as restraints on trade. That ban remained unchanged until 1621, when a restriction that was limited to a specific geographic location was found to be an enforceable exception to the previously absolute rule. Almost a hundred years later, the exception became the rule with the 1711 watershed case of Mitchel v Reynolds which established the modern framework for the analysis of the enforceability of non-compete agreements.

Impact
A 2021 study of the U.S. health care sector from 1996–2007 found that noncompete agreements in this sector led to higher prices for physicians, smaller medical practices and greater medical firm concentration.

A 2021 study found that noncompete agreements for low-wage workers have been shown to lower wages; a study determined that the 2008 Oregon ban on noncompete agreements for workers paid by the hour "increased hourly wages by 2%–3% on average." The study also showed that the Oregon ban on noncompete agreements for low-wage workers "improved average occupational status in Oregon, raised job-to-job mobility, and increased the proportion of salaried workers without affecting hours worked."

By country

Belgium 
In Belgium, CNCs are restricted to new employments within Belgium and for no more than one year. The employer must pay financial compensation for the duration of the CNC, amounting at least half of the gross salary for the corresponding period.

Canada
Canadian courts will enforce non-competition and non-solicitation agreements, however, the agreement must be limited in time frame, business scope, and geographic scope to what is reasonably required to protect the company's proprietary rights, such as confidential marketing information or client relations and the scope of the agreement must be unambiguously defined. The 2009 Supreme Court of Canada case Shafron v. KRG Insurance Brokers (Western) Inc. 2009 SCC 6, held a non-compete agreement to be invalid due to the term "Metropolitan City of Vancouver" not being legally defined.

The 2000 Ontario Court of Appeals case Lyons v. Multary established a general preference towards non-solicitation over non-competition agreements, regarding the latter as "much more drastic weapons" and held a non-competition agreement to be invalid when a non-solicitation agreement would have been sufficient to protect the company's interests.

China

Applicable personnel

For an employee who has the obligation to protect the employer's confidentiality and trade secrets, the employer and the employee may agree on the inclusion of non-competition clauses in the employment contract or a separate non-disclosure agreement. In the event that the employment contract has been terminated or has expired, during the agreed non-competition period, the employer shall pay compensation to the employee on a monthly basis. If the employee breaches the non-competition agreement, he/she shall pay damages to the employer as agreed.

The personnel subject to non-competition agreement shall be limited to the employer's senior management, senior technicians and other personnel with a confidentiality obligation. The scope, area and term of the non-competition agreement shall be agreed by both the employer and the employee, and such agreement must not violate the laws and regulations.

Rights and obligations

Upon termination or expiration of the employment contract, the term of non-competition for any of the persons as mentioned in the preceding clause to work in any other employer producing or engaging in products of the same category or engaging in business of the same category as this employer shall not exceed two years.

If the parties have reached an agreement on non-competition and compensation, unless another agreement is in place, the employer is entitled to ask the employee to comply with the non-competition obligations when the employment contract is ended, and the People's Court shall support this request. The employee, after complying with the non-competition obligations, is entitled to request the agreed compensation from the employer, and the People's Court shall support this request.

If during the period of non-competition, the employer asks to terminate the non-competition agreement, the People's Court shall support said petition. When terminating the non-competition agreement, if the employee requests the employer to pay an extra 3-month non-competition compensation, the People's Court shall support said request.

Compensation
When the non-competition obligation has been agreed, but the compensation for the duration after the termination or expiration of the employment contract has not been determined, if the employee has performed the non-competition obligations, and requests the monthly compensation which is equal to 30% of his/her average monthly salary of the twelve months previous to the termination or expiration of the employment contract, the People's Court shall support said request.

If the 30% average monthly salary of the twelve months previous to the termination or expiration of the employment contract as mentioned in the preceding clause is lower than the minimum wage of the region where the employment contract is performed, the employer shall pay according to the minimum wage.

Consequence of breach

When an employee violates this Law to terminate the employment contract, or violates the stipulations of the employment contract about the confidentiality obligation or non-competition and any loss is caused to the employer, the employee shall be liable for damage compensation.

If an employer and an employee have agreed upon both a non-competition agreement and compensation in the employment contract or confidentiality agreement, and if after the termination or expiration of the employment contract, the employer has not paid said compensation for three months due to its own reasons and the employee requests termination of the non-competition agreement, the People's Court shall support such request.

After an employee violates the non-competition agreement and pays liquidated damages to the employer, if the employer requests the employee to continue to perform non-competition obligations as agreed, the People's Court shall support such request.

France 
In France, CNCs must be limited in time to a maximum of two years and to a region where the employee's new work can reasonably be seen as competitive. The region can be a city or the whole country, depending on the circumstances. The employer must pay financial compensation, typically 30 percent of the previous salary. A CNC may not unreasonably limit the possibilities of the employee to find a new employment.

Germany 
In Germany, CNCs are allowed for a term up to two years. The employer must provide financial compensation for the duration of the CNC amounting to at least half the gross salary. Unreasonable clauses – for example, excluding similar jobs throughout the whole of Germany – can be invalidated.

India
Section 27 of the Indian Contract Act has a general bar on any agreement that puts a restriction on trade. On this basis, it would appear that all non-compete clauses in India are invalid. However, the Supreme Court of India has clarified that some non-compete clauses may be in interest of trade and commerce, and such clauses are not barred by Section 27 of the Contract Act, and therefore valid in India. Notably, only those clauses backed by a clear objective that is considered to be in advantage of trade and commerce survives this test.

Italy 
In Italy, CNCs are regulated by articles 2125, 2596, and 1751 bis of the civil code.

Netherlands 
In the Netherlands, non-compete clauses (non-concurrentiebeding or concurrentiebeding) are allowed regarding issues such as moving to a new employer and approaching customers of the old company. Unreasonable clauses can be invalidated in court.

Pakistan
According to Section 27 of the Contract Act, 1872, any agreement that restrains a person from exercising a lawful profession, trade or business is void. However, courts of Pakistan have made decisions in the past in favour of such restrictive clauses given that the restrictions are "reasonable". The definition of "reasonable" depends on the time-period, geographical location and the designation of employee. In the case of Exide Pakistan Limited vs. Abdul Wadood, 2008 CLD 1258 (Karachi), the High Court of Sindh stated that reasonableness of the clause will vary from case to case and depends mainly on duration and extent of geographical territory

Portugal 
In Portugal, CNCs are regulated by article 136 of the labor code and restricted to two years extendible to three years in cases of access to particularly sensitive information. The employer must pay financial compensation for the duration of the CNC but the law doesn't specify anything regarding the amount of the compensation.

Romania 
In Romania, CNCs are regulated by articles 21–24 of the labor code and restricted to two years. The employer must pay financial compensation for the duration of the CNC, amounting to at least 50 percent of the last 6 months salary.

Spain 
In Spain, CNCs are regulated by article 21 of the labor law. CNCs are allowed up to two years for technical professions and six months for other professions.

United Kingdom 
In the United Kingdom, CNCs are often called restraint of trade or restrictive covenant clauses, and may be used only if the employer can prove a legitimate business interest to protect in entering the clause into the contract. Mere competition will not amount to a legitimate business interest.

Restrictions are normally limited in duration, geographical area (an "area covenant"), and content.

In Crown dependencies, as there are no directly relevant laws it is generally accepted that UK Crown law applies but in the case of intellectual property many financial and other institutions require employees to sign 10-year or longer CNCs which could be seen to apply even if they leave the country or enter an unrelated field of work.

United States
The majority of U.S. states recognize and enforce various forms of non-compete agreements. A few states, such as California, North Dakota, and Oklahoma, totally ban noncompete agreements for employees, or prohibit all noncompete agreements except in limited circumstances. For this reason, non-compete agreements have been popular among companies with employees working in states where they are allowed. They are very common among commercial radio stations and television stations, especially for radio personalities and television personalities working for media conglomerates. For example, if a radio or television personality quits, is laid off or fired from one station in the media market they work in, they cannot work for another competing station in the same market until their contract expires with their former employing station.

As of 2018, non-compete clauses cover 18 percent of United States workers. While more prevalent among higher-wage workers, non-competes covered 14 percent of workers without college degrees in 2018. In March 2019, the U.S. Federal Trade Commission was under pressure by politicians, unions, and advocacy groups to ban non-compete clauses. A related petition estimated that "one out of every five U.S. workers – or about 30 million – is bound by such an agreement." In July 2021, President Joe Biden signed Executive Order 14036, urging the chair of the Federal Trade Commission which he had recently appointed, to "curtail the unfair use of non-compete clauses and other clauses or agreements that may unfairly limit worker mobility". On January 5, 2023, the FTC proposed a rule banning non-compete agreements.

California
Non-compete agreements are automatically void as a matter of law in California, except for a small set of specific situations expressly authorized by statute. They were outlawed by the original California Civil Code in 1872 (Civ. Code, former § 1673).

Enforcement of out-of-state agreements 
A leading court decision discussing the conflict between California law and the laws of other states is the 1998 decision Application Group, Inc. v. Hunter Group, Inc. In Hunter, a Maryland company required that its Maryland-based employee agree to a one-year non-compete agreement. The contract stated that it was governed by and to be construed according to Maryland law. A Maryland employee then left to work for a competitor in California. When the new California employer sued in California state court to invalidate the covenant not to compete, the California court agreed and ruled that the non-compete provision was invalid and not enforceable in California. Business and Professions Code Section 16600 reflects a "strong public policy of the State of California" and the state has a strong interest in applying its law and protecting its businesses so that they can hire the employees of their choosing. California law is thus applicable to non-California employees seeking employment in California.

Whether California courts are required by the Full Faith and Credit Clause of the United States Constitution to enforce equitable judgments from courts of other states, having personal jurisdiction over the defendant, that enjoin competition or are contrary to important public interests in California is an issue that has not yet been decided.

Exceptions 
There are limited situations where a reasonable non-compete agreement may be valid in California.
 Where the owner of a business is selling the entire business, or is selling the goodwill in the business, the seller may be bound by a non-compete clause.
 When there is a dissolution or disassociation of a partnership.
 Where there is a dissolution of a limited liability company.

Colorado

Non-compete agreements in the state of Colorado are generally void unless they fall into a few select exceptions. Those exceptions include "(a) Any contract for the purchase and sale of a business or the assets of a business; (b) Any contract for the protection of trade secrets; (c) Any contractual provision providing for recovery of the expense of educating and training an employee who has served an employer for a period of less than two years; and (d) Executive and management personnel and officers and employees who constitute professional staff to executive and management personnel." At the time the statute was enacted, Colorado's approach to regulating non-compete agreements was a unique approach.

Florida
The enforceability of non-compete agreements in the state of Florida is quite common. Some law firms build their law practice around these agreements and represent employees, employers and potential new employers of an employee currently bound by a non-compete agreement. The agreement is not allowed to be overly broad and generally difficult to enforce if it is for more than two years. However, Florida courts will rarely refuse to enforce a non-compete agreement due to its length or geographic scope. Instead, under Florida law, courts are required to "blue pencil" an impermissibly broad or lengthy non-compete agreement to make it reasonable within the limits of Fla. Stat. § 542.335. Also if the agreement is part of a general employment contract then there is the possibility of a prior breach by an employer. This may cause the non-compete clause of the contract to become unenforceable. However, recent case law from Florida's appellate courts may reduce the scope of the prior breach defense.

Hawaii
A new law bars high-tech companies, but only such companies, in Hawaii from requiring their employees to enter into "non-compete" and "non-solicit" agreements as a condition of employment. The new law, Act 158, went into effect on July 1, 2015.

Illinois
Non-compete agreements will be enforced in Illinois if the agreement is ancillary to a valid relationship (employment, sale of a business, etc.) and (1) must be no greater in scope than is required to protect a legitimate business interest of the employer, (2) must not impose an undue hardship on the employee, and (3) cannot be injurious to the public. While reasonable geographic and temporal limitations on the non-compete agreement are not expressly required by governing law, they tend to be examined as a measure of whether the scope of the non-compete is greater than is required to protect a legitimate business interest of the employer.

Unlike other jurisdictions, which follow the general rule that consideration is only important as to whether it exists and not as to whether it is adequate, Illinois will inquire into the adequacy of consideration. The majority of courts will require at least two years of continued at-will employment to support a non-compete agreement (or any other type of restrictive covenant). However, in certain cases involving particularly sharp conduct by an employee, courts have required less.

While Illinois courts state the rule above, logically the analytical steps should be in reverse order—because inadequate consideration is fatal to the claim. Thus, under McInnis v. OAG Motorcycle Ventures, Inc. there are three requirements in order for a post employment restrictive covenant limiting a former employee's right to work for a competitor to be enforceable under Illinois law:
(1) it must be ancillary to a valid contract;
(2) it must be supported by adequate consideration; and
(3) it must be reasonable, considering whether it: (a) is no greater than is required for the protection of a legitimate business interest of the employer, (b) does not impose undue hardship on the employee, and (c) is not injurious to the public.
The McInnis decision interpreted the Fifield decision, above, to mandate two years’ employment in order for consideration to be adequate.

Before January 1, 2021, the Illinois Freedom to Work Act prohibited employers from entering into a covenant not to compete with Illinois employees earning the greater of (1) the hourly rate equal to the minimum wage required by the applicable federal, State, or local minimum wage law or (2) $13.00 per hour. 

The Illinois legislature passed an amendment to the Illinois Freedom to Work Act in 2021, that will take effect on January 1, 2022, which prohibits employers from entering into a non-compete agreement with an employee unless the employee earns over $75,000 per year.  

The law codified the Illinois common law conditions that the non-compete agreement must (1) be reasonably necessary to protect the legitimate business interest of the employer, (2) be ancillary to a relationship or valid contract, and (3) be reasonably supported by adequate consideration.

One legitimate business interest that Illinois law protects is long-term relationships between a business and its customers.

Additionally, the law further codified the common law concerning non-compete agreements in that (1) a non-compete covenant must be no greater than is required for the protection of a legitimate business interest of the employer, (2) the non-compete covenant must not impose an undue hardship on the employee, and (3) the non-compete covenant must not be injurious to the public.  

Further, in order for a non-compete agreement to be enforceable, the employer must advise the employee in writing to consult with an attorney before entering into the non-compete agreement and the employer must provide the employee with a copy of the covenant at least 14 calendar days before the commencement of the employee's employment or the employer.  

The Illinois Attorney General may initiation or intervene in a civil action in the name of the people of the state of Illinois if it believes that an employer is engaged in a pattern and practice prohibited by the Illinois Freedom to Work Act.

If an employer includes a choice of law provision in an Illinois employee's employment agreement, the court will still apply Illinois law as to the covenant not to compete.

Maine
Maine imposes a number of restrictions upon non-compete agreements, which the state defines as a contract that "prohibits an employee or prospective employee from working in the same or similar profession or in a specified geographic area for a defined period of time following termination of employment."

Maine's 2019 L.D. 733 considers non-compete clauses contrary to public policy and valid only to protect employers' legitimate business interests, such as trade secrets, confidential information and goodwill. Under L.D. 733, employees making 400% or less of the federal poverty level (changing every year, but approximately $50,000 annually once quadrupled) cannot be made to sign non-compete agreements. Additionally, with mixed exceptions for physicians, non-competes can only take effect after one year from the employee's start date or six months after being signed, whichever is later. Prospective employers must disclose in writing the existence of non-compete agreements to prospective employers before making job offers; if a non-compete is to be signed, the employer must deliver it to current or prospective employees at least three business days before the required signing date. Violations result in fines of not less than $5,000.

The same penalty is incurred for restrictive employment agreements, defined as agreements between two or more employers, including franchises and contractors/subcontractors, that “prohibit or restrict one employer from soliciting or hiring another employer’s current or former employees." Such agreements, commonly known as anti-poaching or no-poaching agreements, are categorically prohibited in Maine.

Massachusetts

In October, 2018, a law went into effect that banned new non-compete agreements for all workers eligible for overtime, limited them to one year for others, and required compensation of 50% of salary (or other "mutually agreed upon consideration") for the period in effect. Litigation is expected to resolve the question of what counts as reasonable "mutually agreed upon consideration".

History
By 1837, Massachusetts had indisputably adopted the analysis established in Mitchel. In 1922, the Supreme Judicial Court eliminated any doubt that restrictive covenants in the employment context would be enforced when reasonable. The basic proposition enunciated long ago continued to apply in the 2000s: “A covenant not to compete is enforceable only if it is necessary to protect a legitimate business interest, reasonably limited in time and space, and consonant with the public interest.”

Effective October 1, 2018, Massachusetts passed legislation — the Massachusetts Noncompetition Agreement Act (MNAA) — that fundamentally changed its noncompete law in several respects. Most significantly, under the MNAA, noncompetes must be given to employees with at least 10 business days notice; must satisfy specific, new consideration requirements; must be limited to 12 months, absent misconduct by the employee bound by the noncompete; and may not be used for "(i) an employee who is classified as nonexempt under the Fair Labor Standards Act, 29 U.S.C. 201-219; (ii) undergraduate or graduate students that partake in an internship or otherwise enter a short- term employment relationship with an employer, whether paid or unpaid, while enrolled in a full-time or part-time undergraduate or graduate educational institution; (iii) employees that have been terminated without cause or laid off; or (iv) employees age 18 or younger.”

New Hampshire
New Hampshire imposes a number of restrictions upon non-compete clauses. The state defines a non-compete agreements as "an agreement that restricts such a low-wage employee from performing work for another employer for a specified period of time; working in a specified geographic area; or working for another employer that is similar to the work done by the employee for the employer who is a party to the non-compete agreement."

RSA 275:70 (2014) requires employers to disclose to prospective employees the existence of non-compete agreements and to make copies of those agreements available to prospective employees before they accept positions. Failure to disclose renders the non-compete agreement unenforceable, although other provisions, such as non-disclosure agreements (NDAs) and trade secret rules, remain in effect.

RSA 329:31-a (2016) makes unenforceable post-employment geographic restriction clauses for New Hampshire physicians' practice of medicine. This law applies to all forms of professional relationships with physicians, including partnerships and employment, and does not affect or invalidate other non-geographic post-employment restrictions.

RSA 275:70a (2019) prohibits and nullifies all existing non-compete contracts with low wage workers, defined as those earning hourly wages less than or equal to twice the federal minimum wage (assuming 2080 hours per year, the federal minimum yearly wage is $15,080; a low-wage NH worker makes ≤$30,160 per year).

Rhode Island
The Rhode Island Noncompetition Agreement Act, made effective January 2020, imposes a number of restrictions on non-compete agreements.

Under the Act, non-compete agreements are not enforceable against employees 18 or under; school-enrolled undergraduate or graduate students (whether paid or unpaid or interns or employees); employees considered nonexempt under the federal Fair Labor Standards Act (FLSA); or low-wage employees, defined as those with annual earnings not greater than 250% of HHS federal poverty guidelines. While these guidelines change yearly, the current amount multiplied by 2.5 is over $31,000 annually.

The Act does not grandfather in pre-existing non-compete agreements. It also contains certain exemptions so as not to ensnare other forms of business agreement.

Texas
Under Texas law, a covenant not to compete Article 15 of the Texas Business and Commerce Code covers this issue.

Specific rules apply to physicians, notably that a physician cannot be prohibited "from providing continuing care and treatment to a specific patient or patients during the course of an acute illness even after the contract or employment has been terminated".

However, Texas courts will not enforce a covenant not to compete if the court determines that such a covenant "is against public policy and therefore substantively unconscionable".

Several Texas Supreme Court opinions from 2006 onwards have broadened the nature of the consideration necessary to render a noncompete covenant enforceable. In a 2006 case, Alex Sheshunoff Management Services, L.P. v. Johnson and Strunk & Associates, L.P., it was held that an "otherwise enforceable agreement" can include an executory promise made in conjunction with an at-will employment agreement. This case required that the employer actually perform the promise it made at the time that it secured the non-competition agreement, for example by providing access to certain proprietary information or training. In a later 2009 case, Mann Frankfort Stein & Lipp Advisors, Inc.v. Fielding, the Supreme Court held that a covenant not to compete in an at-will employment agreement is also enforceable if the employee expressly promises not to disclose confidential information, but the employer makes no express return promise to provide confidential information, where "the nature of the employment for which the employee is hired will reasonably require the employer to provide confidential information to the employee for the employee to accomplish the contemplated job duties".

Utah
CNCs are enforceable, but any CNC entered into after May 10, 2016, may not extend for a period of more than one year.

Virginia
In Virginia, the enforceability of covenants not to compete is governed by common law principles. As restrictions on trade, CNCs are not favored by Virginia courts, which will enforce only narrowly drafted CNCs that do not offend public policy.

In Virginia, a plaintiff must prove by a preponderance of the evidence that the covenant is reasonable in the sense that it is: (1) no greater than necessary to protect its legitimate business interests, such as a trade secret; (2) not unduly harsh or oppressive in restricting the employee's ability to earn a living; and (3) not against public policy. Paramount Termite Control Co., Inc v. Rector, 380 S.E.2d 922, 924 (Va. 1989).

Legitimate business interest 
In Virginia, courts weigh the (1) function, (2) geographic scope and (3) duration of the CNC against the employer's legitimate business interests to determine their reasonableness. Additionally, CNCs are only reasonable if they prevent the employee from entering into direct competition with the employer and must not encompass any activity in which the employer is not engaged. Virginia courts will not generally attempt to revise or enforce a narrower restriction in a non-compete agreement. As a result, a drafting error or unenforceable restriction may render the entire agreement unenforceable in Virginia.

Reasonable restriction on employee's ability to earn a living
Second, to enforce the CNC, a plaintiff must show that it is not unduly harsh or oppressive in restricting the employee's ability to earn a living. In Virginia, a CNC is not unduly harsh or oppressive if balancing its function, geographic scope and duration the employee is not precluded from (1) working in a capacity not in competition with the employer within the restricted area or (2) providing similar services outside the restricted area.

Public policy
Third, to enforce a CNC, a plaintiff must show the CNC is reasonable from the standpoint of a sound public policy. Virginia does not favor restrictions on employment and therefore CNCs are generally held against public policy unless they are narrowly drafted as enumerated above. In Virginia, a CNC does not violate public policy if the restrictions it imposes do not create a monopoly for the services offered by the employer or create a shortage of the skills provided by the employee.

Washington
According to Racine v. Bender, CNCs will be enforced by courts if they are validly formed and reasonable. There are exceptions, like in Labriola v. Pollard Group, Inc., where the Washington Supreme Court invalidated a CNC not supported by independent consideration by strictly enforcing the pre-existing duty rule.

The Washington Legislature in 2020, with RCW 49.62, nullified existing and future non-compete clauses for "low level" workers, defined as employees making $100,000 or less annually and independent contractors making $250,000 or less annually with both dollar amounts tied to inflation. Some criticized the setting of salary thresholds at only $100,000 as effectively exempting highly-paid Seattle tech-workers, noting how Amazon's lobbying efforts lowered the initial threshold, roughly $180,000, down to the enacted $100,000. Non-voided non-competes are also limited to a maximum post-employment length of 18 months, after which they become void. Additionally, employers must disclose the exact terms of non-compete agreements to prospective employees in writing before the prospective employees accept employment; failure to comply nullified the non-compete agreement.

Washington's restrictions on non-compete clauses excludes any such clause associated with the purchase or sale of any ownership interest or goodwill in a business.

Cases
 In 2005, Microsoft and Google litigated the enforceability of a non-compete clause in Kai-Fu Lee's employment contract with Microsoft. Difference in state laws were highlighted as Google attempted to maneuver the case to California courts, where California law would be more likely to hold the clause unenforceable.
 IBM v. Papermaster (No. 08-9078, 2008 U.S. Dist): Mark Papermaster moving from IBM to Apple computer in 2008.

Related restrictive covenants
While CNCs are one of the most common types of restrictive covenants, there are many others. Each serves a specific purpose and provides specific rights and remedies. The most common types of restrictive covenants are as follows:
 Garden-leave clause: a type of CNC by which an employee is compensated during the period that the employee is restricted.
 Forfeiture-for-Competition Agreement and Compensation-for-Competition Agreement: an agreement by which an employee either forfeits certain benefits or pays some amount of money to engage in activities that are competitive with his former employer.
 Forfeiture agreement: an agreement by which an employee forfeits benefits when his employment terminates, regardless of whether he engages in competitive activities.
 Nondisclosure/confidentiality agreement: an agreement by which a party agrees not to use or disclose the other party's confidential information.
 Non-solicitation agreement: an agreement by which an employee agrees not to solicit and/or not to accept business from the employer's customers.
 Antipiracy agreement: an agreement by which an employee agrees not to solicit and/or not to hire the employer's employees.
 Invention assignment agreement: an agreement by which an employee assigns to the employer any potential inventions conceived of during employment.

The enforceability of these agreements depends on the law of the particular state. As a general rule, however, with the exception of invention assignment agreements, they are subject to the same analysis as other CNCs.

No-poaching agreements between employers are typically considered illegal anti-competitive collusion. (See for example High-Tech Employee Antitrust Litigation concerning Silicon Valley employers in the 2000s.)

References

Works cited

External links
 What you should know about non-compete agreements, PBS

Contract law
Covenant (law)
Labour law
Contract clauses